Thomas Griffith Jenkins [Tut] (April 10, 1898 – May 3, 1979) was a reserve outfielder in Major League Baseball who played for the Boston Red Sox (1925–1926), Philadelphia Athletics (1926) and St. Louis Browns (1929–1932). Jenkins batted left-handed and threw right-handed. He was born in Camden, Alabama.

In a six-season career, Jenkins was a .259 hitter (119-for-459) with three home runs and 44 RBI in 171 games, including 42 runs, 14 doubles, six triples, and one stolen base. He made 109 outfield appearances at right field (75), left (32) and center (2).

Jenkins died in Weymouth, Massachusetts at age 81.

Sources

Retrosheet

Boston Red Sox players
Philadelphia Athletics players
St. Louis Browns players
Major League Baseball outfielders
Baseball players from Alabama
People from Camden, Alabama
1898 births
1979 deaths
Paris Parisians (KITTY League) players